The 2014 Marist Red Foxes football team represented Marist College in the 2014 NCAA Division I FCS football season. They were led by 23rd year head coach Jim Parady and played their home games at Leonidoff Field. They were a member of the Pioneer Football League. They finished the season 4–7, 4–4 in PFL play to finish in a tie for fifth place.

Schedule

Source: Schedule

References

Marist
Marist Red Foxes football seasons
Marist Red Foxes football